
Gmina Prószków, German Gemeinde Proskau is an urban-rural gmina (administrative district) in Opole County, Opole Voivodeship, in south-western Poland.

Since 2006 the commune, like most of the area, has been bilingual in German and Polish, a substantial German population having remained behind after the area was transferred to Poland.

Villages
The commune contains the villages and settlements of:

Prószków
Boguszyce
Chrząszczyce
Chrzowice
Folwark
Górki
Jaśkowice
Ligota Prószkowska
Nowa Kuźnia
Przysiecz
Winów
Zimnice Małe
Zimnice Wielkie
Źlinice
Złotniki

Neighbouring gminas
Gmina Prószków is bordered by the city of Opole and by the gminas of Biała, Komprachcice, Korfantów, Strzeleczki, Tarnów Opolski and Tułowice.

Twin towns – sister cities

Gmina Prószków is twinned with:
 Hünfeld, Germany
 Ternberg, Austria
 Pruszków, Poland

References

Proszkow
Opole County
Bilingual communes in Poland